Bertha Schroeder (1872–1953) was a notable New Zealand officer of The Salvation Army, social worker, and probation officer. She was born in Australia in 1872.

References

1872 births
1953 deaths
New Zealand Salvationists
New Zealand social workers
Probation and parole officers
Australian emigrants to New Zealand
Burials at Eastern Cemetery, Invercargill